Leandro Livramento Andrade (born 24 September 1999) is a professional footballer who plays as a winger for Azerbaijan Premier League club Qarabağ FK. Born in Portugal, he plays for the Cape Verde national team.

Club career
Andrade spent three years developing in Olhanense's youth academy before was promoted to the senior team in 2018. The following year, he joined Fátima before moving to Bulgarian side Cherno More Varna in July 2020.

Andrade made his Bulgarian First League debut on 16 August 2020 as a substitute in a 4–0 away win over Etar Veliko Tarnovo.

International career
Born in Portugal, Andrade is of Cape Verdean descent. He was called up to represent the Cape Verde national team for a set of friendlies in March 2022. He debuted with Cape Verde in a 6–0 friendly win over Liechtenstein on 25 March 2022.

References

External links

Player Profile at foradejogo.net

1999 births
Living people
People from Tavira
Sportspeople from Faro District
Portuguese sportspeople of Cape Verdean descent
Cape Verdean footballers
Portuguese footballers
Association football midfielders
Cape Verde international footballers
First Professional Football League (Bulgaria) players
Azerbaijan Premier League players
S.C. Olhanense players
C.D. Fátima players
PFC Cherno More Varna players
Qarabağ FK players
Cape Verdean expatriate footballers
Portuguese expatriate footballers
Cape Verdean expatriate sportspeople in Bulgaria
Portuguese expatriate sportspeople in Bulgaria
Expatriate footballers in Bulgaria
Cape Verdean expatriate sportspeople in Azerbaijan
Portuguese expatriate sportspeople in Azerbaijan
Expatriate footballers in Azerbaijan